Nostra Signora di Guadalupe e San Filippo Martire in Via Aurelia (Our Lady of Guadalupe and St. Philip Martyr in Via Aurelia) is the national church of Mexico in Rome. Opened in 1958, it was established as a titular church by Pope John Paul II in 1991, with Juan Jesús Posadas Ocampo as its first titular Cardinal Priest (1991-1993). It is owned and served by the Legion of Christ.

History

It was built between 1955 and 1958 by architect Gianni Mazzocca as a church to attend the Mexican community in Rome. It was consecrated by Cardinal Vicar Clemente Micara on 12 December 1958. The church is also home to a parish, established by decree of Cardinal Micara on 22 September 1960 and entrusted to the Legion of Christ. In January 1991 it was elevated to the rank of minor basilica and on 28 June 1991 it was formally made Mexico's national church and a titular church by Pope John Paul II. Juan Sandoval Iñiguez is the incumbent Cardinal Priest since 1994.

Cardinal Priest
Established as a titular church on 28 June 1991.

Juan Jesús Posadas Ocampo, 28 June 1991 (appointed)-24 May 1993 (died).
Juan Sandoval Iñiguez, 26 November 1994 (appointed)-present.

External links
Official website

Titular churches
Catholic Church in Mexico
Christian organizations established in 1960
National churches in Rome
Roman Catholic churches completed in 1960
1960 establishments in Mexico
Rome S. IX Aurelio
20th-century Roman Catholic church buildings in Italy